San Clemente District is one of eight districts of the province Pisco in Peru.

References

1985 establishments in Peru